The Mussolini family is a well-known family in Italy. The most prominent member was Benito Mussolini, the fascist dictator of Italy from 1922 to 1943. Other members of the family include: 

Alessandro Mussolini (1854–1910), blacksmith, socialist, the father of Benito Mussolini, and the father-in-law of Rachele Mussolini
Rosa Maltoni Mussolini (1858–1905), mother of Benito Mussolini and the mother-in-law of Rachele Mussolini, married to Alessandro Mussolini
Benito Mussolini (1883–1945) 
Rachele Mussolini (1890–1979), wife of Benito Mussolini, sister-in-law of Arnaldo and Edvige Mussolini
Edda Mussolini (1910–1995), daughter of Benito Mussolini, married to Galeazzo Ciano, 2nd Count of Cortellazzo and Buccari
Fabrizio Ciano, 3rd Count of Cortellazzo and Buccari (1931–2008), memoirist, grandson of Benito Mussolini, last Count of Cortellazzo and Buccari
Vittorio Mussolini (1916–1997), film critic and producer, son of Benito Mussolini
Caio Giulio Cesare Mussolini (born 1968), great-grandson of Benito Mussolini, grandson of Vittorio, stood for the 2019 European Parliament election in Italy as a member of the right Brothers of Italy political party.
Bruno Mussolini (1918–1941), pilot in the Regia Aeronautica, son of Benito Mussolini
Romano Mussolini (1927–2006), musician and painter, son of Benito Mussolini, married , who is the sister of Sophia Loren
Alessandra Mussolini (born 1962), politician, granddaughter of Benito Mussolini
Romano Floriani Mussolini (born 2003), footballer, great-grandson of Benito Mussolini
Rachele Mussolini (born 1973/1974), councillor of the city of Rome, granddaughter of Benito Mussolini
Arnaldo Mussolini (1885–1931), journalist and politician, younger brother of Benito Mussolini, brother-in-law of Rachele Mussolini
Edvige Mussolini (1888–1952), younger sister of Arnaldo and Benito, and sister-in-law of Rachele Mussolini

Other people 

 Eugene Mussolini (born 1977), Rwandan politician

See also
Mussolinia (disambiguation)
George C Scott (Actor 1985; Series:Mussolini The Untold Story)

References

 
Italian families
Freemasonry in England